Mayflower was the victorious U.S. defender of the sixth America's Cup in 1886 against Scottish challenger Galatea.

Design

The sloop Mayflower was the second America's Cup defender designed by Edward "Ned" Burgess, built by George Lawley & Son and launched in 1886 for owner General Charles J. Paine of Boston. It was built entirely of wood: oak and hard pine. She was skippered by Martin V. B. Stone. Her sails were made by John H. McManus of McManus & Son.

Career

 
In the trials, Mayflower defeated the yachts Puritan (Burgess' first victorious Cup defender),  Priscilla, and Atlantic, and was subsequently selected to defend the 1886 Cup.

By 1889 the Mayflower was purchased by F. Townsend Underhill, who had it altered to become a schooner. In 1905 Lady Eva Barker bought the vessel and outfitted it with an engine. She chartered it to adventurer Guy Hamilton Scull in 1908 on an expedition seeking the treasure of a sunk Spanish galleon off Jamaica. The Mayflower was sunk itself off Cuba in a hurricane during this expedition, and the crew was rescued by passing steamers.

References

External links
 America's Cup Official Website for the 32nd America's Cup in Valencia
 1890s Yacht Photography of J.S. Johnston

America's Cup defenders
Individual sailing vessels
Yachts of New York Yacht Club members
1886 in sports